Hemiflagellochloris is a monotypic genus of green algae in the family Volvocaceae. It has only one known species, Hemiflagellochloris kazakhstanica.

References

External links

Chlamydomonadales genera
Chlamydomonadales
Monotypic algae genera